Eva M. Harth FRSC is a full professor at the University of Houston and director of the Welch Center for Excellence in Polymer Chemistry. The current research direction of the Harth group focuses on incorporating functional groups into polyolefins. The group has a long-standing interest in novel biomedical materials and technologies to increase the therapeutic function of synthetic and biological substances.

She received her undergraduate degree from the University of Bonn (BS) and her graduate degrees at the University of Zurich (MS) and the Max Planck Institute for Polymer Research (PhD). Under the guidance of Klaus Müllen, Harth worked towards her PhD on fullerene-based polymers and completed her thesis, Synthesis and properties of new fullerene adducts and fullerene-containing polymers, in 1998. Harth then moved to the United States as a National Science Foundation postdoctoral fellow to the IBM Almaden Research Center. After the two years working with Craig Hawker on polymeric nanoparticles and nitroxide polymerization, she moved to a start-up company XenoPort. In 2004, she started at Vanderbilt University as assistant professor, was promoted to associate professor in 2011, and served three years as director and DGS of the Interdisciplinary Materials Science Graduate Program (IMS).

During her career at Vanderbilt, she developed the nanosponge delivery system that is licensed by a start-up company. The biodegradable nanoparticle composed of crosslinked polyester, containing tiny cavities that can store drug molecules. The nanoparticle breaks down in the body, releasing the drug in a predictable fashion and can be further functionalized with a targeting peptide to favor drug delivery to cancerous cells.

With the move to the University of Houston as full professor in 2017, she expanded her research interest into the area of metal-organic chemistry and her group is combining polymerization methodologies to design novel polymer structures containing polyolefins. In 2018, her research group developed the metal-insertion light-initiated radical (MILRad) polymerization and in 2022 the Polyolefin Active Ester Exchange (PACE) process to give access to polyolefin block copolymers containing vinylic, acrylic and polyester and polyamide segments.

In 2017, Harth received a Gutenberg Chair Award from the University of Strasbourg and was admitted as a Fellow of the Royal Society of Chemistry. From 2009–2018, she served as an associate editor for Polymer Chemistry, a journal of the RSC.

She is a member of the advisory board of Polymer Chemistry and is an Associate Editor of the European Polymer Journal.

Awards and honors 
 2007 NSF Career Award 
 2017 Gutenberg Chair
 2017 Fellow of the Royal Society of Chemistry
 2021 Fellow of the American Chemical Society

References 

Polymer scientists and engineers
Living people
University of Bonn alumni
University of Zurich alumni
University of Houston faculty
Vanderbilt University faculty
German women chemists
21st-century German chemists
21st-century women scientists
Fellows of the Royal Society of Chemistry
21st-century German women
Fellows of the American Chemical Society
1968 births